Vanguard Films & Animation, often named only as Vanguard Animation, is an American production studio founded in 2002 by producer John H. Williams and Neil Braun. The studio has offices in British Columbia, Canada and Ealing Studios in London, England, United Kingdom. Starz Media owns the studio's minority stake.

History
The studio was founded in 2002 by John H. Williams. For its launch, it signed with Ealing Studios a four-picture deal to produce sub-$40 million computer-animated films. The following year, Vanguard sold a minority stake to IDT Corporation and partnered with its animation unit, Digital Production Solutions, to co-produce and co-own all Vanguard's properties, including Valiant (2005) produced for Disney.

Filmography

Feature films

Upcoming

Short films
 Frank Was a Monster Who Wanted to Dance

Unproduced projects
 Citizen Siege - A science fiction thriller CGI-animated film that was to be co-produced by Vanguard and video game developer Oddworld Inhabitants. The plot involves an expatriate who returns home to find that he has been repossessed, in a shady underhive-like world where a corporate government rules the continent. The film was originally scheduled to release in 2009, but the date was pushed back to an unknown date. As of 2019, there have been no recent developments regarding the film's production.
Alien Rock Band
Rotten Island
Buzby
City of Dragons
Atomic Circus
Oz Wars
Ribbit
The Twits
Galaxy High
The Gnome King

See also
 List of computer-animated films

References

External links 
 

 
American animation studios
Film production companies of the United States